Falsimargarita stephaniae is a species of sea snail, a marine gastropod mollusk in the family Calliostomatidae.

Description

Distribution
This species occurs in the Atlantic Ocean off the Falkland Islands at a depth of 1200 m.

References

 Bouchet, P.; Fontaine, B. (2009). List of new marine species described between 2002–2006.

stephaniae
Gastropods described in 2005
Molluscs of the Atlantic Ocean